Umberto Alongi (born 26 July 1976) is a Swiss Italian singer and songwriter.

Biography 
After living and sharing his time for years between Italy (where he was born) and Switzerland, beginning in 2014 he has been producing two solo albums through the record labels Im Digital, Auditoria Reccords and with Me & U Records and Artists Management based in London. Alongi sings in Italian, Spanish and English and he also plays the guitar.

As of September 2015 he is included in the Swiss pre-selection for the Eurovision Song Contest 2016. In October 2015 he participated in the Ghedi Festival for unreleased songs as the only Swiss male artist in the competition. He reached the semi-finals by beating a selection of 300 artists with the song "Come stai".

The song "Come stai" written by Marco Giorgi (Mariadele) was launched on the radio on 30 November 2015. The song reached the Italian airplay ranking in 7th place out of the 10 tracks most broad-cast by Italian radio and the 72nd place in the international top 100. The song was produced by the record company Latlantide, the company with which Alongi will produce his new album.

He has collaborated with Valentino Alfano (Mina), Marco Elfo Buongiovanni (Cugini di campagna), Matteo Di Franco (Adriano Celentano, Patty Pravo, Tullio De Piscopo) and Andrea Zuppini (Fabio Concato, Alex Baroni, Fiorella Mannoia).

Umberto Alongi was the founding member of Diesel 23 in Lugano in 2010 with whom he performed for five years until the band broke up in early 2015. With Diesel 23 he released the album Last Chance through the Music-Mad Records label.

He was the founder in 2016 of the charity project "Contesti" in favor of OTAF Foundation with the participation of six other Swiss Italian artists. For this project he composed with Valentino Alfano a song named "Noi siamo qui".

As of September 2016 he is included in the Swiss selection for the Eurovision song contest 2017 with a new song "I can just be me". This song is candidate for "Die grosse entscheidungsshow" and it is included on his new album entitled 3 minuti.

A new album titled Illimitatamente was released in November 2017 in Fino Mornasco Italy, played with Massimo Scoca (bass player) Stewart Copeland, Dee Dee Bridgewater, Bryan Adams, John Martyn, Level 42, Bob Geldof, Tito Gomez (European Tour), John Davis, Linda Wesley, Paul Jeffrey, Tullio De Piscopo, Gatto Panceri, Enzo Iannacci, Enrico Ruggeri, Lucio Dalla and many more); Giordano Colombo (drums player) (Franco Battiato, Antony and the Johnson, Gianna Nannini, Giorgia, Alessandra Amoroso, Valerio Scanu etc); Antonio "Aki" Chindamo (Caterina Valente, Rockets, Marco Ferradini, Riccardo Fogli, Paola Turci, Andrea Braido); Andrea Gentile (guitar player) (Raphael Gualazzi, Giovanni Caccamo, Deborah Iurato, Ermal Meta, Benji e Fede, Marco Carta, Simone Tomassini, Paolo Meneguzzi, Niccolò Agliardi).

The last single "Pura Follia" was launched on the radio on 18 June 2018. 
The song reached the Italian airplay ranking in 1st place out of the 10 tracks most broad-cast by Italian radio.

On 2019 He released the new album "Se amore c'è", reaching the Italian airplay indie chart with the single "Con quanto c'è da fare".

The new studio album "Equidistanti" was launched in December 2020. The album was recorded at the Roxy Studio with the featurings of Kenya and AREA.

Collaborations 
 Gaetano Capitano
 Antony Franceschi
 Marco Giorgi
 Valentino Alfano
 Marco Elfo Buongiovanni
 Andrea Zuppini
 Matteo Di Franco

Selected discography

Studio albums 
 3 minuti – (Me&U Records – iM Digital) – 2016
 Illimitatamente – (Me&U Records – Auditoria Records)- 2017
 Se amore c'è – (Me&U Records)- 2019
 Equidistanti – (Me&U Records)- 2020

Singles 
 Come il respiro – (Tunecore) – 2015
 Con un altro – (Me&U Records) – 2015
 Come stai – (Latlantide) – 2015
 Che Natale è – (Me&U Records) – 2015
 Lei non-c'è più (Latlantide) – 2016
 3 minuti – (Me&U Records – iM Digital) – 2016
 Ragazzi Italiani – (Auditoria Records) – 2017
 Tempo ne avrò – (Me&U Records – Auditoria Records) – 2017
 Il futuro si è perso – (Me&U Records – Sony Music Publishing) – 2018
 Pura Follia  – (Me&U Records) – 2018

Featuring 
 I miss you – Diesel'23 – 2015 
 Someone to love – Diesel'23 – 2015
 Noi siamo qui – Contesti – (Me&U Records) – 2016
 Oh Anima feat. Valentino Alfano – (Auditoria Records) – 2017

Spanish-language singles 
 Abrazame – 2014
 Como estas – 2015

Appearances 
 Eurovision Song Contest – September 2015 – Switzerland Pre-selection
 Eurovision Song Contest – September 2016 – Switzerland Pre-selection
 Ghedi Festival – November 2015 – Semi-finalist

External links 

 
 Umberto Alongi Artist page MusicBrainz

References 

1976 births
Italian pop singers
Living people
Italian  male singer-songwriters
Italian-language singers of Switzerland
Spanish-language singers
21st-century Swiss male  singers
21st-century Italian  male  singers